The 2006 Southeastern Conference baseball tournament was held at Hoover Metropolitan Stadium in Hoover, AL from May 24 through 28.  Ole Miss won the tournament and earned the Southeastern Conference's automatic bid to the 2006 NCAA Tournament.

Regular Season Results

Tournament

Mississippi State, Tennessee, Florida and Auburn did not make the tournament.

All-Tournament Team

See also
College World Series
NCAA Division I Baseball Championship
Southeastern Conference baseball tournament

References

SECSports.com All-Time Baseball Tournament Results
SECSports.com 2006 Baseball Standings
SECSports.com All-Tourney Team Lists

Tournament
Southeastern Conference Baseball Tournament
Southeastern Conference baseball tournament
Southeastern Conference baseball tournament
College sports tournaments in Alabama
Baseball competitions in Hoover, Alabama